André Danican Philidor may refer to:

 François-André Danican Philidor (1726–1795), chess master and composer
 André Danican Philidor the elder ( 1647–1730), Philidor l'ainé, father of François-André Danican, composer and music archivist